"D.R.E.A.M." (an acronym of "Drugs Rule Everything Around Me") is a song by American singer Miley Cyrus from her second extended play, She Is Coming (2019). It features guest vocals by American rapper Ghostface Killah, and was written by Cyrus, Killah, John Cunningham, RZA, and Ilsey Juber, while being produced by Cunningham and RZA. It samples Wu-Tang Clan's 1993 song "C.R.E.A.M." throughout, with the group members credited as co-writers.

"D.R.E.A.M." is a R&B song that references the singer's relationship with drugs. Promotion for the track began with a live debut of the song at BBC Radio 1's Big Weekend on May 27, 2019, and subsequently continued on other music festivals. A one minute accompanying clip sequence for the song was released on May 31, 2019, through Cyrus' official YouTube channel. It features black and white footage of the singer, wearing a black sheer bra.

Composition
"D.R.E.A.M." is two minutes and forty-eight seconds long. It was written by Cyrus, Ghostface Killah, John Cunningham, RZA, and Ilsey Juber, while its production was done by Cunningham and RZA. It samples Wu-Tang Clan's 1993 song "C.R.E.A.M." throughout, which in turn samples the Charmels' 1967 song, "As Long As I've Got You", with Wu-Tang members credited as co-writers.

"D.R.E.A.M" is a R&B song with a pop tune and a trap production. It references the singer's relationship with drugs and honors her party lifestyle: "Always last to leave the party/Drugs rule everything around me/Wake up with new tattoos on my body/Drugs rule everything around me/Hit the Goose, raise a toast, pop the molly," she sings in part of the chorus. Killah's verse drops in the outro, offering his own perspective on drug use: "The drugs rule everything around me/You could call me a king/I got it all in my store, you should crown me/Purple Perc, sticky green Mollies, sipping lean."

Cyrus namechecks American boxer Muhammad Ali and country singer and godmother Dolly Parton, while Killah references Michael Jackson's 1982 song "Billie Jean".

Critical reception
Writing for Vulture, Craig Jenkins found that "D.R.E.A.M." "wisely revisits the chipper mood of Miley’s best-loved hits," and that the song's "understated trap production and festive lyrics work well." He also complimented the sequencing of "D.R.E.A.M." with the track "Cattitude", which schedules RuPaul's voice directly after Killah's verse. Erica Gonzales of Harper's Bazaar described the song as "an airy, chilled-out pop tune," and speculated that "Miley got [Wu-Tang Clan's] blessing if she was able to get the sample cleared and managed to get [Killah] to drop a verse in the outro." She also pointed that "considering the amount of backlash Cyrus has received on social media for her take on hip hop during her Bangerz era, it's unclear how this collaboration will ride with rap fans." Mike Neid from Idolator described Killah's verse as "vibe-killing."

Live performances
Cyrus first performed "D.R.E.A.M." at BBC Radio 1's Big Weekend in North Yorkshire on May 27, 2019, four days before the song's release. On May 31, she performed the song at Primavera Sound festival in Barcelona. She also sang "D.R.E.A.M." the following day at the Orange Warsaw Festival in Warsaw.

Credits and personnel
Credits adapted from Tidal.
 Miley Cyrus – main vocals, songwriting
 Ghostface Killah – featured vocals, songwriting
 Ilsey Juber – background vocals, songwriting, record engineering assistance, guitar
 John Cunningham – production, songwriting, mixing engineering, guitar, keyboards, programming
 RZA – production, songwriting
 Method Man – songwriting
 Raekwon – songwriting
 David Porter – songwriting
 GZA – songwriting
 Isaac Hayes – songwriting
 Inspectah Deck – songwriting
 U-God – songwriting
 Ol' Dirty Bastard – songwriting

Charts

References

External links
 

2019 songs
Miley Cyrus songs
Ghostface Killah songs
Songs written by David Porter (musician)
Songs written by Ghostface Killah
Songs written by Ilsey Juber
Songs written by Isaac Hayes
Songs written by Method Man
Songs written by Miley Cyrus
Songs written by Ol' Dirty Bastard
Songs written by Raekwon
Songs written by RZA
Song recordings produced by RZA
Songs about drugs
Trap music songs